is a book of poems and collage art by Nobel Prize-winning author Herta Müller. It was first published in 2005.

References 

German poetry collections
2005 poetry books